Brian Norton may refer to:
 Brian Norton (tennis)
 Brian Norton (engineer)
 Brian Norton (rugby league)